Astronomy Day is an annual event in the United States and later in other countries, intended to provide a means of interaction between the general public and various astronomy enthusiasts, groups and professionals.

History 
This event was started in 1973 by Doug Berger, the president of the Astronomical Association of Northern California. His intent was to set up various telescopes in busy urban locations so that passersby could enjoy views of the heavens. Since then the event has expanded and is now sponsored by a number of organizations associated with astronomy.

Originally, Astronomy Day occurred on a Saturday between mid-April and mid-May, and was scheduled so as to occur at or close to the first quarter Moon. In 2007, an autumn rendition of Astronomy Day was added. It was scheduled to occur on a Saturday between mid-September and mid-October so as to be on or close to the first quarter Moon.

Future events 
The lunar influence on the schedule means that the events happen on a different date each year, rather than set calendar dates. The table below shows the dates for up coming Astronomy Days:

Past events 

The Astronomical League canceled the in-person event in 2020 due to the global pandemic of COVID-19 virus.  Some organizations, such as the Lowell Observatory, hosted virtual events to continue the tradition.

See also
Events
 Earth Hour
 Earth Day/Earth Week
 Earth Week
 100 Hours of Astronomy (100HA)
 National Dark-Sky Week (NDSW)
 National Astronomy Week (NAW)
 World Space Week (WSW)
White House Astronomy Night

References

External links 
 Astronomical League information page on Astronomy Day
 Royal Astronomical Society of Canada - Astronomy Day
 Sky And Telescope
 A Csillagászat Napja 2018-ban

Astronomy education events
April observances
May observances
Unofficial observances
September observances 
October observances
Observances about science
Observances held on the first quarter moon